Percival "Pinky" Pinkerton is a fictional character appearing in American comic books published by Marvel Comics. The character's first appearance was in Sgt. Fury and his Howling Commandos #8 (July 1964), in which he replaced Jonathan Junior Juniper who was killed in issue #4. He was created by writer Stan Lee and artist Jack Kirby.

Pinky Pinkerton was portrayed by Richard Short, in the TV series Agent Carter which is set in the Marvel Cinematic Universe.

Fictional character biography
Percival "Pinky" Pinkerton was an English member of the original Howling Commandos who fought alongside the team during World War II. A British Army commando and gentleman ranker who used an umbrella as a weapon along with his Thompson submachine gun, Pinkerton had served alongside the unit commander Captain Samuel Happy Sam Sawyer prior to Pearl Harbor when both were with the British Commandos.

Along with Col Timothy Dum Dum Dugan and Dino Manelli, he helped organize the Deadly Dozen.

Though never explained in the series, Pinkerton wore a Carlist Requetés type red beret with a yellow tassel with his battledress that may have involved service in the Spanish Civil War. Pinkerton also wore his battle dress with an open collar with scarf rather than having the buttoned collar of a British other rank.

In issue #23 ("The Man Who Failed") of Sgt. Fury and his Howling Commandos, Percy's older brother, Lieutenant Colonel Pinkerton appeared.  The story, set in Burma revealed that Pinkerton came from an English family with a long tradition of service as officers to the Crown.  Why Pinkerton never accepted a commission was explained as his living a playboy womanizing life style during his initial military training that led him to be unable to catch up with his studies and resigning.

In the first Sgt Fury Annual taking place with the Howlers (Howling Commandos) being recalled up to service in the Korean War, Pinkerton was a sergeant as were all the other former private soldiers of the unit. At the time of their 1966 Vietnam War mission (Sgt Fury and his Howling Commandos Annual #3) Pinkerton was managing a Playboy Club in London.

Pinkerton, Izzy Cohen and Dino Manelli had a reunion with Nicholas Fury aboard the S.H.I.E.L.D. Helicarrier.

As with several other of the Howling Commandos, Pinkerton joined S.H.I.E.L.D. He was said to have died in London after a long battle with cancer, with Dum Dum Dugan at his side.

Pinkerton and the Essex Regiment
Pinkerton wore Essex Regiment shoulder flashes on his battledress. The battalion that Lt. Colonel Pinkerton led was referred to as the "Burma Dragons". During the Burma Campaign the Essex Regiment were part of the Chindits. A famous member of the regiment was Arthur Ernest Percival who was commissioned into the regiment in 1916 and achieved fame as the Regimental Intelligence Officer where the Irish Republican Army put a price on his head.  He later commanded the Imperial Garrison at Singapore, surrendering his command to the Japanese in 1942.

Ancestry
Three ancestors of Percy were mentioned in Sgt. Fury and his Howling Commandos. These include:

 A Pinkerton who survived the winter at Valley Forge in 1777-1778
 Pinkerton who fought in the battle of Waterloo in 1815.
 An ancestor who fought during World War I.

Character basis
In a 2002 interview with the Traditional Values Coalition's executive director Andrea Sheldon Lafferty about the latest incarnation of the comic book character of the Rawhide Kid who was now homosexual, Stan Lee said, "years ago [a comic book] that I did, Sgt Fury, ...had a gay character. One member of the platoon was called, I think, Percy Pinkerton. He was gay. We didn't make a big issue of it. In this comic book that I read, the word gay wasn't even used. He's just a colorful character who follows his own different drummer. He follows a different beat. But we're not proselytizing for gayness". In a 2005 interview, however, Lee stated that Pinkerton came off as being gay but that "it wasn't purposely done that way".

In Sgt Fury #23 Pinkerton was portrayed as a playboy. Artist Dick Ayers said in an interview that Stan Lee told him to base Pinkerton on the womanizing actor David Niven.

In other media
 Pinky Pinkerton appears in The Avengers: Earth's Mightiest Heroes episode "Meet Captain America". He is seen as a member of the Howling Commandos.
 Pinky Pinkerton appears in the Agent Carter episode "The Iron Ceiling", portrayed by Richard Short. He is among the soldiers that assist Peggy Carter, Jack Thompson, and Dum Dum Dugan in raiding a Russian military complex that was selling stolen weapons to Leviathan.

References

External links
 

Characters created by Jack Kirby
Characters created by Stan Lee
Comics characters introduced in 1964
Fictional gay males
Fictional Korean War veterans
Fictional World War II veterans
Howling Commandos
LGBT characters in comics
Marvel Comics LGBT superheroes
Marvel Comics male superheroes